The Oasis Leisure Centre (commonly called Swindon Oasis) was an entertainment and sports complex just outside the town centre of Swindon, Wiltshire, England, with facilities including a lagoon swimming pool, gym, bar, and concert hall. It was in operation from 1976 to 2020.

History 

The building was designed by Peter Sargent of Gillinson, Barnett and Partners for Thamesdown Borough Council, on part of the site of the former railway works. It was constructed in 1974–5 at a cost of around £3million and opened on 1 January 1976. Its  diameter glazed dome, rising from a grass berm, is described by Historic England as "a sophisticated and architecturally striking structure which provides a dramatic setting for the pool within". The leisure pool was designed to appeal to families, irregular in shape, overlooked by balconies and decorated with artificial rocks and planting troughs. There were waterslides and a wave machine.

Alterations in 1987 added three enclosed waterslides, at the time the longest in the country, which were accessed from a tower outside the dome. In that year the Oasis was Wiltshire's most popular tourist attraction.

The concert hall became a major venue for touring acts and held approximately 3,000 people standing, or 1,620 seated. In the 1990s, the rock band Oasis took their name from the leisure centre after lead singer Liam Gallagher suggested it, having seen it listed as a venue on an Inspiral Carpets tour poster in the childhood bedroom he shared with his brother Noel. 20 years later, in 2011, Liam performed there for the first time with his new band Beady Eye.

Closure 
It was announced on 18 November 2020 that the leisure centre was permanently closed and would not re-open after the ongoing COVID-19 pandemic restrictions ended.

In May 2021 the Twentieth Century Society placed the site on its 'Top 10 Buildings at Risk' list.

In June 2021, the local campaign group Save Oasis Swindon staged a protest outside the front of the centre, and ran a social media campaign. The group conducted extensive research, finding the original plans to the centre, as well as evidence as to why the Oasis should be listed.

In December 2021, part of the building was given Grade II listed status.

The domed swimming pool and the earthen bank were included in the listing, while the waterslides, launch tower and splash pool, the linking entrance block and the service structures attached to the south side were not. Historic England stated that the leisure pool, the fourth of its type to be built in England, was the earliest one surviving.

References

Buildings and structures in Swindon
Sports venues in Swindon
Swimming venues in England
Grade II listed buildings in Wiltshire